I.O.B. Spezialauftrag' (I.O.B. Special Mission) was a German crime television series after Percy Stuart and Sergeant Berry that featured an American hero.

Premise 
Mike Jackson is an American of German origin and was an FBI agent. Now he is the best agent of an international detective agency and works in particular for their location in Hamburg.  The equipment of his Porsche included already in 1981 a video telephone.  Occasionally a young Austrian lady from Vienna assists him.

Reception 
The series was not as successful as "Percy Stuart". It had been produced by the same company, Claus Wilcke was again the star and there were also guest stars such as Iris Berben, but FBI agents weren't any longer as popular in Germany as they had been at the time of the first wave of Jerry Cotton films with George Nader. Also Elvis Presley hadn't made and feature films for a long time and subsequently German spectators were certainly less impressed by the fact that Claus Wilcke had dubbed him. However, there were no re-runs and neither has the series been released on DVD yet.

References

External links 

Claus Wilcke's Homepage

German crime television series
1980 German television series debuts
1981 German television series endings
Television shows set in Hamburg
German-language television shows
ZDF original programming